Rafał Makowski (born 5 August 1996) is a Polish professional footballer who plays as a midfielder for Nemzeti Bajnokság I club Kisvárda.

Honours

Club
Legia Warsaw
Ekstraklasa: 2015–16
Polish Cup: 2015–16

References

External links
 
 

Living people
1996 births
Footballers from Warsaw
Association football midfielders
Polish footballers
Poland youth international footballers
Poland under-21 international footballers
MKP Pogoń Siedlce players
Radomiak Radom players
Legia Warsaw II players
Legia Warsaw players
Zagłębie Sosnowiec players
Śląsk Wrocław players
Kisvárda FC players
Ekstraklasa players
I liga players
II liga players
III liga players
Nemzeti Bajnokság I players
Polish expatriate footballers
Expatriate footballers in Hungary
Polish expatriate sportspeople in Hungary